Schefflera simplex is a species of flowering plant in the family Araliaceae native to northern Brazil and Venezuela. It was first described in 1988 by Julian Steyermark and E. C. Holst.

References

simplex
Flora of North Brazil
Plants described in 1988